Pirate Treasure is a 1934 Universal film serial.  It was the twenty-first sound serial released by Universal, of the sixty-nine they released in total (it was the eighty-ninth serial if Universal's silent serials are considered as well, of a total of 137 serials).  It was a rare example of the swashbuckling genre in the film serial medium.

Ray Taylor directed Richard Talmadge, Lucille Lund and Walter Miller (as the hero, love interest and villain respectively).  The serial is especially praised for the stunt work of Talmadge.

Plot
Aviator Dick Moreland uses his winnings from a recent flight to fund an expedition to recover treasure buried by his pirate ancestor.  However, Stanley Brasset, another member of Moreland's club, steals his map and sets out to find the treasure for himself.  Dorothy Craig becomes involved when Dick needs her car to chase Brasset's henchmen and recover the map, which results in Dorothy being kidnapped and requiring rescue by Dick.  When told of the treasure, Dorothy offers her father's yacht to take them to the island.  Unable to retain the map, Brasset joins the expedition (his identity as the villain unknown to the protagonists) with henchmen hidden aboard.  The henchmen are discovered and attempt to take over the ship en route to the Caribbean but this fails.  Brasset releases them again after arrival to stop Dick from recovering the treasure.  The treasure chest itself is empty and the search by the two parties continues on the island. Island natives eventually capture Brasset and his henchmen and plan to sacrifice them.  Dick intervenes and they are brought back to America as prisoners.

Cast
Richard Talmadge as Dick Moreland, aviator and adventurer
Lucille Lund as Dorothy Craig
Walter Miller as Stanley Brasset, villain
Patrick H. O'Malley, Jr. as John Craig, Dorothy's father
Ethan Laidlaw as Curt, One of Brasset's henchmen
William Desmond as Captain Jim Carson
William L. Thorne as Drake
Del Lawrence as Robert Moreland

Production
Pirate Treasure is a rare swashbuckling serial and the best example of the type.

Critical reception
Due to its eerie background and the stunt work of Richard Talmadge, Cline considers Pirate Treasure the most memorable of the costume serials.  Hans J. Wollstein at Allmovie does not consider the acting or writing to be of a high standard but praises the stunts: "Talmadge's acrobatics are as exciting today as they must have been in 1934."  Wollstein especially highlights the stunt in chapter three (Wheels of Fate) in which Talmadge falls between awnings from the top of a building.

Chapter titles
 Stolen Treasure
 The Death Plunge
 The Wheels of Fate
 The Sea Chase
 Into the Depths
 The Death Crash
 Crashing Doom
 Mutiny
 Hidden Gold
 The Fight for the Treasure
 The Fatal Plunge
 Captured
Source:

Cliffhangers

Cliffhangers
Stolen Treasure: The speeding car carrying Dick goes over a cliff into the sea.
Death Plunge: Dick is thrown from the roof of a tall building by Brasset's henchmen.
Wheels of Fate: Dick, on a motorbike, heads towards a narrow bridge blocked by the henchmen's truck.
Sea Chase: The motorboat carrying Dick & Dorothy collides with one piloted by Brasset's henchment.
Into the Depths: Dick falls from the ship's rigging into the sea.
The Death Crash: Dick and henchmen go over a cliff in a speeding car.
Crashing Doom: Dick falls to the deck of the ship during a loading accident.
Mutiny: Dick enters the burning cargo hold.
Hidden Gold: Dick is attacked by the henchmen and falls over a cliff.
Fight for the Treasure: Dick and Dorothy are caught in an explosion rigged by Brasset.
Fatal Plunge: Dick is attacked by crocodiles while fighting in a swamp.

Resolutions
Death Plunge: Dick swims back to land.
Wheels of Fate: Dicks fall is broken by a series of awnings.
Sea Chase: Dick drives over the side of the bridge, landing on a train below.
Into the Depths: Dick & Dorothy rescued by Dorothy's father.
The Death Crash: Dick survives the fall.
Crashing Doom: Dick survives the fall.
Mutiny: Dick's fall is broken by sacks of flour.
Hidden Gold: The crew extinguish the fire.
Fight for the Treasure: Dick survives the fall.
Fatal Plunge: Dick and Dorothy survive but are trapped in the cave.
Captured: Dick survives the crocodiles.

See also
 List of film serials by year
 List of film serials by studio

References

External links

 (by individual chapter)

1934 films
1934 adventure films
American adventure films
American black-and-white films
1930s English-language films
Treasure hunt films
Universal Pictures film serials
Films directed by Ray Taylor
Films with screenplays by George H. Plympton
1930s American films